Chenogne is a village in Belgium.

Chenogne may also refer to:

Chenogne massacre, that took place at Chenogne, Belgium in 1945

See also
Iness Chepkesis Chenonge (born 1982)